KITI or Kiti may refer to:

 Kiti, Cyprus
 KITI (AM), a radio station (1420 AM) licensed to Centralia-Chehalis, Washington, United States
 KITI-FM, a radio station (95.1 FM) licensed to Winlock, Washington, United States
 Kiti District, a district in Daykundi Province, Afghanistan

See also
 Kitti (disambiguation)